Polymixis is a genus of moths of the family Noctuidae.

Species

 Polymixis acharis (Püngeler, 1901)
 Polymixis achrysa Ronkay, Varga & Hreblay, 1998
 Polymixis alaschja Hacker, [1997]
 Polymixis albiorbis Hreblay & Ronkay, 1998
 Polymixis albirena (Boursin, 1944)
 Polymixis ancepsoides Poole, 1989
 Polymixis aphrodite Fibiger, 1997
 Polymixis apora (Staudinger, 1897)
 Polymixis argillaceago (Hübner, [1822])
 Polymixis argillosa (Boursin, 1970)
 Polymixis atossa (Wiltshire, 1941)
 Polymixis aurora (Turati, 1924)
 Polymixis bacheri (Püngeler, 1902)
 Polymixis beata Hreblay & Ronkay, 1998
 Polymixis bischoffi (Herrich-Schäffer, [1850])
 Polymixis boursini (Rungs, 1949)
 Polymixis bousseaui (Lucas, 1934)
 Polymixis calamistis (Hampson, 1906)
 Polymixis carducha (Wiltshire, 1957)
 Polymixis carolina Hacker & Legrain, 1999
 Polymixis chosroes (Brandt, 1938)
 Polymixis chrysographa (Wagner, 1931)
 Polymixis colluta (Draudt, 1934)
 Polymixis csorbagabori Ronkay, Varga & Hreblay, 1998
 Polymixis culoti (Schawerda, 1921)
 Polymixis draudti (Boursin, 1952)
 Polymixis dubia (Duponchel, [1838])
 Polymixis dubiosa (Brandt, 1938)
 Polymixis dyssymetrica (Rungs, 1967)
 Polymixis fabiani Ronkay, Varga & Hreblay, 1998
 Polymixis fiorii (Boursin, 1940)
 Polymixis flavicincta – Large Ranunculus (Denis & Schiffermüller, 1775)
 Polymixis germana (Rothschild, 1914)
 Polymixis gilva Sukhareva, 1976
 Polymixis gracilis (Brandt, 1941)
 Polymixis hedygramma (Brandt, 1941)
 Polymixis himalaya Hacker & Weigert, 1990
 Polymixis iatnana Hacker, 1996
 Polymixis ivanchiki Pekarsky, 2012
 Polymixis juditha (Staudinger, 1897)
 Polymixis latesco Fibiger, 2001
 Polymixis lea (Staudinger, 1897)
 Polymixis leuconota (Frivaldszky, 1841)
 Polymixis lichenea (Hübner, [1813])
 Polymixis longilinea (Draudt, 1950)
 Polymixis magnirena (Alphéraky, 1892)
 Polymixis mandshurica Boursin, 1970
 Polymixis manisadjiani (Staudinger, 1881)
 Polymixis nasamonius (Turati, 1924)
 Polymixis nigrogrisea Hreblay & Ronkay, 1998
 Polymixis omanensis (Boursin, 1970)
 Polymixis pamiridia Boursin, 1967
 Polymixis paravarga Ronkay, 1990
 Polymixis perchrysa Hacker & Ronkay, 1992
 Polymixis pericaspicus Ronkay, Varga & Hreblay, 1998
 Polymixis petrolignea (Draudt, 1950)
 Polymixis philipsi (Püngeler, 1911)
 Polymixis polymita (Linnaeus, 1761)
 Polymixis polymorpha Boursin, 1960
 Polymixis rebecca (Staudinger, 1891)
 Polymixis remota (Püngeler, 1900)
 Polymixis rjabovi (Boursin, 1944)
 Polymixis roehrei (Boursin, 1961)
 Polymixis rosinae (Bohatsch, 1909)
 Polymixis rubrimixta (Hampson, 1906)
 Polymixis rufocincta (Geyer, [1828])
 Polymixis rungsi Plante, 1975
 Polymixis rupicola (Turati, 1934)
 Polymixis schistochlora Ronkay, Varga & Hreblay, 1998
 Polymixis scrophulariae (Wiltshire, 1952)
 Polymixis seposita (Püngeler, 1914)
 Polymixis serpentina (Treitschke, 1825)
 Polymixis shensiana (Draudt, 1950)
 Polymixis stictineura Boursin, 1960
 Polymixis sublutea (Turati, 1909)
 Polymixis subvenusta (Püngeler, 1906)
 Polymixis susica (Rungs, 1950)
 Polymixis trisignata (Ménétriés, 1848)
 Polymixis variabile (Stertz, 1915)
 Polymixis vartianorum (Varga, 1979)
 Polymixis versicolora (Draudt, 1950)
 Polymixis viridinigra Hreblay & Ronkay, 1997
 Polymixis viridula (Staudinger, 1895)
 Polymixis xanthomista (Hübner, [1819])
 Polymixis zagrobia (Wiltshire, 1941)
 Polymixis zophodes Boursin, 1960

References
 Natural History Museum Lepidoptera genus database
 Polymixis at funet.fi

Cuculliinae
Taxa named by Jacob Hübner